Mangyongdae is a neighborhood in Mangyongdae-guyok, Pyongyang, North Korea. North Korean propaganda claims Mangyongdae is the birthplace of North Korean leader Kim Il-sung, although in his memoirs he wrote that he had been born in the nearby neighborhood of Chilgol. Mangyongdae is where his father Kim Hyong-jik was from, and where Kim Il-sung spent his childhood.

Mangyongdae has been designated as a historic site since 1947, and is listed as a Revolutionary Site. Original structures at the site have been replaced with replicas.

Mangyongdae has since been incorporated to the city of Pyongyang. The Football at the Mangyongdae Prize Sports Games and Mangyongdae Prize International Marathon are both named after the area.

References

Works cited

Further reading

 

Geography of Pyongyang